James York may refer to:

James W. York (born 1939), American mathematical physicist, expert on general relativity
James Warren York (1839–1927), American musician and business figure
Lefty York (1892–1961), baseball pitcher
Jim York (catcher) (1895–1934), American baseball player
Jim York (pitcher) (born 1947), American baseball player

See also
James Yorke (disambiguation)